Bijaei Jayaraj also known as Bijai Jayarajan is an Indian entrepreneur, who is the founder CEO of Loylty Rewardz, a brand loyalty program management company that he founded in 2006 and it was acquired in 2017 by BillDesk. Currently, he is the founder & chief executive officer of the digital privacy focused startup Houm Technology Private Limited.

Early life and education 
Jayaraj was born and raised in Thrissur, Kerala for the first 18 years of his life.

Jayaraj completed his MBA in strategic marketing and leadership from the Indian School of Business (ISB), Hyderabad in 2002 as part of the Founding Class. He also holds a master's degree from Jawaharlal Nehru University, New Delhi and a bachelor's degree from Loyola College, Chennai.

Career 
After completing his MBA from the ISB, he joined Jet Airways and headed their loyalty programme, Jet Privilege, in Mumbai. He founded Loylty Rewardz Management Pvt. Ltd. in June 2006, which was later acquired at a value of about US$100 million. The company had a consumer base of over 1 billion consumers under Loylty Rewardz's loyalty program management.

Bijaei raised over US$30 million of venture capital investment into Loylty Rewardz. The company managed to beat highly funded companies such as PAYBACK India. He ran the company for a decade before its acquisition. He is one of the early few entrepreneurs in India to have offered multibagger exits to his VC investors.

In 2018, Bijaei founded Houm Technology Private Limited, a company that allows its users to own private space on the Internet, which can be used to store the digital assets and carryout private communication.

Earlier, he had worked in the advertising industry in Muscat, Sultanate of Oman, and with McCann Erickson World Wide (FP7) in Dubai, UAE. He also worked for MasterCard Worldwide as the head of MasterCard's relationship with the State Bank of India in 2007. He was conferred with the MasterCard SAMEA Star Award (South Asia, ME & Africa) and the APMEA Star Award (Asia Pacific, ME & Africa).

See also 

 List of Indian entrepreneurs
 List of people from Kerala

References

External links 
 Kiwis Can Now Own Their Own Place On The Internet
 Own A Piece Of the Internet
 6 start-up mistakes to avoid at The Times of India
 Retailers are banking on loyalty programs to retain customers! (Interview)
 Bijaei Jayaraj's Interview at TravelBizMonitor
 Bijaei Jayaraj - Bloomberg Profile
 An Exclusive Sneak Peek at What's Next for Digital Privacy

Living people
Indian businesspeople
Indian Internet company founders
Indian chief executives
People from Kerala
Jawaharlal Nehru University alumni
Indian technology company founders
Year of birth missing (living people)